Tzu-Hsien Tung (born c. 1960) is a Taiwanese businessman and philanthropist. He is a co-founder and former vice chairman of Asus. He serves as the chairman of Pegatron, currently.

Early life
T.H. Tung was born in 1960 and grew up in Ruisui, Hualien County, Taiwan. His father was a watchmaker. He grew up in the countryside, without a television set, and played Little League Baseball. He became an avid reader, and was influenced by the works of Yang Mu and Hu Shih.

Tung received a master's degree in computer and communication engineering from the National Taipei University of Technology. While he was at university, he regularly skipped class to read independently instead, often reading censored books. He was also the editor-in-chief of the campus newspaper.

Career
Tung started his career at Acer Inc. T.H. Tung co-founded Asus in 1989. He served as its vice chairman. He became the majority shareholder of Eslite Bookstore.

Tung serves as the chairman of Pegatron. Additionally, he serves as the chairman of Kinsus and Lumens.

Philanthropy
According to CommonWealth Magazine, "He has sponsored countless artistic and cultural events and financed historical research on late presidents Chiang Kai-shek and Chiang Ching-kuo and documentaries on the careers of Taiwanese writers."

References

1960s births
Living people
People from Hualien County
Taiwanese businesspeople
Taiwanese company founders
Taiwanese philanthropists
National Dong Hwa University alumni
National Taipei University of Technology alumni
Asus
20th-century Taiwanese businesspeople
21st-century Taiwanese businesspeople